Highland High School is a public high school located in Cowiche, Washington. It is the only high school in the Highland School District. The school serves 348 students in grades 9–12. 62% of the students are Hispanic, while 36% are White, 1% are American Indian and 1% are two or more races.

References

External links
Highland School District #203
Highland H.S.

Public high schools in Washington (state)
High schools in Yakima County, Washington